Battleman Milton MacIntyre (March 8, 1907 – November 27, 1968) was a Canadian politician. He served in the Legislative Assembly of British Columbia, one of the two components of parliament, from 1949 to 1952  from the electoral district of Mackenzie, a member of the Coalition government.

References

1907 births
1968 deaths